Sizwe Sydney Mdluli (born 17 May 1969) is a Swazi athlete. He competed in the men's long jump at the 1988 Summer Olympics and the 1992 Summer Olympics.

References

1969 births
Living people
Athletes (track and field) at the 1988 Summer Olympics
Athletes (track and field) at the 1992 Summer Olympics
Swazi male long jumpers
Swazi male triple jumpers
Olympic athletes of Eswatini
Place of birth missing (living people)